The Sri Lankan Advanced Level (A-level), is a General Certificate of Education (GCE) qualification exam in Sri Lanka, similar to the British Advanced Level, conducted annually by the Department of Examinations of the Ministry of Education. It is usually taken by students during the optional final two years of collegiate level (grade 12 and 13 (usual age 18–19) or external (non-school) candidates, after they have completed GCE Ordinary Level exams. The majority of candidates enter the exams via their respective schools, while candidates who have finished school education can also apply as private applicants. The qualification also serves as an entrance requirement for Sri Lankan state universities. The exams are held in three mediums: Sinhala, Tamil and English.

Fields Of Study 
The candidates are expected to study for 2 years at collegiate level before taking the examination. The examination diversifies over 5 major fields of study,
 Physical Science stream (Combined Mathematics, Physics and Chemistry or Information Technology or Higher Mathematics )
 Biological Science stream (Biology, Physics or Agricultural Science and Chemistry)
 Commerce stream
 Arts stream
 Technology stream (The subjects include Engineering Technology, Bio-system Technology, Science for Technology and a category subject)

In each stream, candidates are expected to face 3 subjects related to the specific stream. Additionally, there would be a General English test and a Common General test. Although the result of the General English test is not taken into account for the University Entrance selection criteria, candidates are expected to obtain a pass mark for the Common General test.

Exam procedure

The exams are conducted each year in August, in selected national schools across the country. Invigilators and supervisors are appointed by the Department of Examinations and they are typically qualified teachers of the local school system. Candidates are allowed to sit for the exam 3 times to qualify for a state university, i.e. the candidates have to meet the minimum requirements for university admission within 3 attempts in order gain university admission. The test assessments are carried out by marking panels usually consisting of qualified and experienced school teachers in service, who are guided by supervisors (usually university lecturers). It takes about 4–5 months for the final results of the island-wide examination to be released and candidates have to wait further for around one year to enter a local university, depending on the university and the course/field of study.

Physical Science stream
Physical Science stream is also known as Maths stream. Physical science stream has four main subjects: Combined Mathematics, Physics, Chemistry, and Information and Communication Technology (ICT). Under the recent syllabus, candidates can choose between either Chemistry or ICT, though Combined Mathematics and Physics are mandatory.
Combined Mathematics is a combination of Pure Mathematics and Applied Mathematics. Previously, the candidates had to follow these two subjects separately; by introducing Combined Mathematics syllabi, the two separate subjects were appended and redrafted.

The curriculum also consists of practical experiments that students are expected to participate in school laboratories.

Biological Science streams
Biological Science stream consists of four subjects: Biology, Chemistry, Physics and Agricultural science.
Candidates do have option of selecting physics or Agricultural science, while biology and chemistry are mandatory .

Commerce stream
Commerce Stream has three main subjects. They are Accounting, Business Studies and Economics. Candidates do have the option of selecting either Business Studies or Business Statistics and Economics or Information Technology (IT)

Technology stream
Technology stream was introduced in 2013. the stream contains three subject categories ; A, B and C.  candidates can select EnTechnology as category B subject, and Information communication technology, or any other subject from the category C subject group. Science for Technology (Category B) is a compulsory subject for both Engineering and Bio-system candidates.
Since the stream is relatively new, number of schools that have the facilities to teach the stream is limited or null in some areas for those who want to study those subjects.

Criticism
It has been noted that in recent years the exam has become extremely competitive and even traumatic for most high school students in Sri Lanka. For the academic year of 2013, out of 55,241 candidates who applied for university admission, only 43.8% were able to gain access to the state universities through the University Grants Commission (UGC), despite satisfying minimum requirements for admission. According to a 2010 study by Child and Adolescent Psychiatry and Mental Health, symptoms of anxiety and depression were common more among students in GCE Advanced Level classes compared to other grades. Students in grade 13 had the second highest depression and anxiety scores, with examination related issues being the most commonly cited problem.  Out of the 445 students that were assessed, 22.9% of students in grade 12 and 28.6% in grade 13 reportedly had severe depression, while 28.6% in grade 12 and 32.1% in grade 13 had severe anxiety. Due to the intimidating nature of the exam, family pressure, and social stigma resulting from exam results, most students tend to get severely depressed if they fail to achieve desired results. Some cases of suicide have been linked to the exam.

See also
 Education in Sri Lanka
 List of schools in Northern Province, Sri Lanka
 Sri Lankan universities
 Government Schools in Sri Lanka
 GCE Ordinary Level in Sri Lanka

References

External links
Department of Examination

Educational qualifications in Sri Lanka
School qualifications
School examinations